Mario Agliati (29 January 1922 in Lugano – 15 October 2011 in Lugano) was a Swiss-Italian journalist, writer and historian. He contributed to the Gazzetta Ticinese and the Corriere del Ticino and in 1953 founded a review entitled Il Cantonetto

Works

 La sezione Baretti, 1951
 La sposina del 1909, 1959
 Lugano del buon tempo, 1963
 L'erba voglio, 1996
 Ottobre 1925: l'Europa a Locarno, 1975
 I problemi del professor Pilati, 1987
 La profezia del dottor Donzelli, 1991
 Il tempietto di due Santi e di due città. Da Sant'Antonio da Padova in Lugano a San Lucio papa in Brugherio, 1994
 Lugano: racconto di ieri e di oggi, 1999

References

Bibliography (in Italian)
 Giovanni Orelli, Svizzera Italiana, Editrice La Scuola, Brescia 1986.
 AA.VV., Dizionario delle letterature svizzere, 1991, 12.
 Luigi Menapace, Lo stile di Agliati, in Il Cantonetto, 2, 1992, 42ss.
 Luciano Vaccaro, Giuseppe Chiesi, Fabrizio Panzera, Terre del Ticino. Diocesi di Lugano, Editrice La Scuola, Brescia 2003, pp. 191 nota, 192 nota, 257 nota, 453.
 Carlo Agliati (ed.), "Una presenza discosta. Testimonianze di amici in ricordo di Mario Agliati 1922–2011", in Il Cantonetto, numero speciale, Lugano giugno 2012.

External links
 
  Mario Agliati in bibliomedia.ch
  Il Cantonetto in cantonetto.ch

People from Lugano
1922 births
2011 deaths
Italian-language writers
Swiss people of Italian descent
Swiss newspaper journalists
20th-century Swiss writers
21st-century Swiss writers
20th-century Swiss historians